Aled Summerhill (born 22 November 1994) is a Rhondda born, Welsh rugby union player who plays for the Cardiff Rugby as a centre, winger, or as a fullback. He was a Wales under-18 international.
Summerhill made his debut for Cardiff in 2014 having previously played for the Cardiff academy.

Summerhill made his debut for Cardiff in 2014 having previously played for the academy. He broke into the team during the 2015 Rugby World Cup period scoring 3 tries in his first 3 games of the season. His performances earned him a callup to train with the Wales national team, although this turned out to be a breach in protocol, for which Wales were warned.

References

External links 
Cardiff Rugby Player Profile

1994 births
Living people
Cardiff Rugby players
Rugby union players from Rhondda Cynon Taf
Welsh rugby union players
Rugby union wings
Rugby union fullbacks